Meschia is a genus of true bugs in the family Meschiidae. There are three described species in Meschia.

Species 
These three species belong to the genus Meschia:

 Meschia barrowensis Malipatil, 2014
 Meschia pugnax Distant, 1910
 Meschia zoui Gao & Malipatil, 2019

References 

Lygaeoidea
Hemiptera genera